Arthur and Lillie is a 1975 American short documentary film directed by Jon H. Else. It was nominated for an Academy Award for Best Documentary Short. The film is a biographical documentary about Arthur and Lillie Mayer - their own lives and their adventures in the formation of "Hollywood" from its earliest days.

References

External links
Arthur and Lillie at Pyramid Media

1975 films
1975 documentary films
1975 short films
1970s English-language films
American short documentary films
1970s short documentary films
Documentary films about Hollywood, Los Angeles
1970s American films